The Polish Athletics Championships is an annual outdoor track and field competition organised by the Polish Athletic Association (PZLA), which serves as the Polish national championship for the sport. It is typically held as a three-day event in the Polish summer, ranging from late June to early August. The venue of the championships changes annually.

Following the establishment of the PZLA in 1919, the national championships was first held in 1920 as a men-only event. The first two championships were held in Lviv (now in Ukraine) as this city was the headquarters of the national sports body and home to the only modern athletics stadium in the country. Women's events were included shortly after in 1922. The women's championships were contested separately from the men's from 1925 to 1949 (1945–46 excepted). The championships has been contested every year since its inception, bar a brief period from 1940 to 1944 when World War II led to abandonment of the competition.

Events
The current track and field programme features a total of 40 individual Polish Championship athletics events, divided evenly between the sexes.

Track running
100 metres, 200 metres, 400 metres, 800 metres, 1500 metres, 5000 metres, 10,000 metres
Obstacle events
100 metres hurdles (women only), 110 metres hurdles (men only), 400 metres hurdles, 3000 metres steeplechase
Jumping events
Pole vault, high jump, long jump, triple jump
Throwing events
Shot put, discus throw, javelin throw, hammer throw
Combined events
Decathlon (men only), heptathlon (women only)

The competition has featured more unusual events, such as the grenade throw for men in 1951 and both men and women in 1952. Men competed in the standing long jump at the 1920 and 1921 editions. This event had a longer history in the women's programme, lasting from 1927 to 1947. A men's 200 metres hurdles was first contested in1 1953 but stopped after 1963. Women contested that event in 1970 and 1971. A few events were unique to women, including the 60 metres (held from 1922 to 1950), a 250 m (1924 to 1926), a 1000 m in 1926 and 1927, and a 500 m from 1949 to 1951.

The women's programme expanded inline with international acceptance of women's athletics. The women's 1500 metres was added in 1969 and the 400 m hurdles followed the year after. The women's 3000 metres was introduced in 1973 and contested up to 1994. The women's equivalents of the men's standard 5000 m and 10,000 m were added in 1984. The 80 metres hurdles was combined with the 100 metres hurdles at the 1968 championships, before the longer distance replaced it the following year. Later additions to the women's programme were triple jump (1991), pole vault and hammer throw (1995) and the steeplechase (1999).

Championship events are held at different locations for combined track and field events, road running and walks, and cross country running.

Editions

Championship records

Men

Women

See also
List of Polish records in athletics

Notes

References

Records
Henryk Kurzyński, Stefan Pietkiewicz, Janusz Rozum, Tadeusz Wołejko: Historia finałów lekkoatletycznych mistrzostw Polski 1920–2007. Konkurencje męskie. Szczecin - Warszawa: Komisja Statystyczna PZLA, 2008. .

External links
Polish Athletics Association website 

 
Athletics competitions in Poland
National athletics competitions
Recurring sporting events established in 1920
1920 establishments in Poland